Neritopsis interlirata is a species of sea snail, a marine gastropod mollusk in the family Neritopsidae.

The specific name richeri in the synonym is in honor of researcher Dr. Bertrand Richer de Forges .

Description

Distribution
The type locality is Rurutu (Avera), Austral Islands, French Polynesia and off the Tuamotu Islands.

References

 Mienis H.K. (2018). Neritopsis interlirata Pease, 1868 an overlooked species from French Polynesia. Triton. 37: 14-17

External links
 Pease W.H. (1868 ["1867"). Description of sixty-five new species of marine Gastropodae, inhabiting Polynesia. American Journal of Conchology. 3(4): 271-297.]
 Lozouet, P. (2009). A new Neritopsidae (Mollusca, Gastropoda, Neritopsina) from French Polynesia. Zoosystema. 31(1): 189-198

Neritopsidae
Gastropods described in 1868